Robert Frazier (born May 15), known professionally as Chill Rob G, is an American hip hop artist from Jersey City, New Jersey, United States.

Career
Chill Rob G's first hip hop collaboration  was being part of the original version of the Flavor Unit collective, which included Lakim Shabazz, The 45 King, and Queen Latifah, among others. He signed with Stu Fine's Wild Pitch Records in 1987, and released one album, Ride the Rhythm, on the label. Ride the Rhythm’s tracks alternated between a somewhat hardcore sound and an easygoing, conversational tone. It was chosen by The Source as one of the 100 Greatest Rap Albums.

In 1989, the a cappella version of his song "Let the Words Flow" were sampled illegally and without permission by the German pop-dance group Snap! on their hit record "The Power". The song was a remix created by German producers Michael Münzing and Luca Anzilotti (under the pseudonyms Benito Benites and John "Virgo" Garrett III.) After the song gained in popularity in Europe, and Arista/BMG records came calling (via Ariola/BMG, the group's label in its home country), Münzing and Anzilotti recruited Durron Butler (aka Turbo B) to record a new version of the song, rather than continue lip-syncing the original Chill Rob G lyrics. It was this version that was ultimately used and promoted as Snap!’s official version.

Chill Rob G virtually disappeared from the hip hop scene for the next decade. He stated in an interview that it was primarily stress within his personal life (and hints at frustration with his label, Wild Pitch) that caused his recession into obscurity at the peak of his career.

He recorded a second album, Black Gold, on independent label Echo International. A deal with the record company was not reached and the album remained unreleased for years before appearing on iTunes on May 6, 2008.

In 1996, his track "Bad Dreams" was covered by the British trip hop artist Tricky on his album Pre-Millennium Tension.

In 2002, he appeared on DSP's album In the Red. He also recorded a song with R.A. the Rugged Man. He has been active intermittently in the years since, recording with Skamadix, Dayta120 and DJ Mark the 45 King. He is at work on several projects, but these remain unreleased.

Discography
Albums
 Ride the Rhythm (1989) Wild Pitch/EMI Records
Black Gold (2000/2008) Echo-Fuego Music Group
Empire Crumbles (March 2022)

Singles
"Dope Rhymes" (1988) Wild Pitch/EMI Records
"Court Is Now in Session" (1988) Wild Pitch/EMI Records
"The Power" (1989) Bellaphon Records
"Let Me Show You" / "Make It" (1990) Wild Pitch/EMI Records
"Let Me Know Something" (1996) Echo International Records
"Look Out Below" / "Higher" (1997) Truly Hype Recordings
"Whatever" (1999) Echo International
"Chilled Not Frozen" (2015) Nobody Buys Records

References

External links
Chill Rob G on Myspace

Living people
Year of birth missing (living people)
African-American male rappers
Musicians from Jersey City, New Jersey
Five percenters
Wild Pitch Records artists
Rappers from New Jersey
21st-century American rappers
21st-century American male musicians
21st-century African-American musicians